Steve Johnson was the defending champion, but chose to compete in the 2014 Gerry Weber Open instead.

Nick Kyrgios won the title, defeating Samuel Groth in the final, 7–6(7–3), 7–6(9–7).

Seeds

  Go Soeda (first round)
  Gilles Müller (quarterfinals)
  Andreas Beck (first round)
  Tatsuma Ito (quarterfinals)
  Samuel Groth (final)
  Yūichi Sugita (first round)
  Marius Copil (quarterfinals)
  Rajeev Ram (semifinals)

Draw

Finals

Top half

Bottom half

References
 Main Draw
 Qualifying Draw

Nottingham Challengeandnbsp;- Singles
2014 Men's Singles